Robbie Davis-Floyd (born Robbie Elizabeth Davis; April 26, 1951) is an American cultural, medical, and reproductive anthropologist, researcher, author, and international speaker primarily known for her research on childbirth, midwifery, and obstetrics. She chose to study women's birth experiences due to her own birth experiences and espouses the viewpoint that midwives play an important role in safeguarding positive outcomes for women giving birth. Beginning in 1983, she has given over 1000 presentations at universities and childbirth, midwifery, and obstetric conferences around the world.

Work 
In Davis-Floyd's first book, Birth as an American Rite of Passage, she defines "technocracy" as a society organized around the super-valuation of high technology and the global flow of information. She argues that the beliefs and practices associated with birth are driven from a "technocratic model" that was influenced by the Industrial Revolution. Birth became industrialized in assembly-line fashion, then "technocratized" by the consistent use of high technologies such as ultrasound and the electronic fetal monitor, which is almost universally used in American births, even though it has been shown to fail to improve outcomes while increasing the cesarean section rate. The publication of the book furthered her interest to study the anthropology of reproduction. Her current focus is on transformational models of maternity care around the world, and on assisting in the humanistic transformation of childbirth via the International Childbirth Initiative described below.

Within their scope of research, Davis-Floyd, other scholars and other birth advocates have worked to ensure that people have access to a range of knowledge on birth, childbirth processes, cultural perspectives, birth customs, safety practices, and health resources. Her primary work in this arena has been to serve as lead editor for the International MotherBaby Childbirth Initiative (IMBCI): 10 Steps to Optimal Maternity Care (2008) and then to serve as lead editor for the International Childbirth Initiative (ICI): 12 Steps to Safe and Respectful Maternity Care (2018), which is a merger of the IMBCI and the 2015 FIGO Guidelines to Mother-Baby-Friendly Birthing Facilities and replaces both the IMBCI and the FIGO Guidelines (see www.internationalchildbirth.org). It is her dream and that of many others for all 12 Steps of the ICI to be fully implemented in every birthing facility worldwide.

In light of her mission and collaborative studies, Davis-Floyd has collaborated with multiple people to explain birth in different contexts and parts of the world. For example, Davis-Floyd and midwife Elizabeth Davis co-authored Intuition as Authoritative Knowledge in Midwifery and Homebirth. Both had examined the interactions among midwives' authoritative knowledge and their trust in their own intuition and in the intuition of women giving birth. This form of authoritative knowledge occurs in a context where independent midwives rely on knowledge that they spiritually and personally embody, primarily through expertise and by knowing the women within the context of their communities. Home birth midwives make a conscious and purposeful attempt to provide alternative knowledge that is scientifically accurate and culturally appropriate. In Cyborg Babies, Davis-Floyd and Dumit show that new reproductive technologies can create a barrier between mother and child, in regards to visualization, conception, and legislation. Reproductive technologies have been analyzed for their merits and paradoxes as they make advancements in cross-cultural landscapes. Cyborg Babies demonstrates that human cyborgs can be both technological and organic—for example, one of its chapters describes an IVF conception ending in a holistic homebirth.

Davis-Floyd's primary theoretical contributions include her analysis of standard obstetric procedures for birth as rituals that convey the core values of the technocracy and her clear delineation and comparison of the "technocratic, humanistic, and holistic models of birth and health care" (see below).These different models of birth, healthcare, and technological usage exist in all societies and fluctuate according to surrounding conditions.

Another primary contribution was her 1993 complete revision and update of Brigitte Jordan's famous 'Birth in Four Cultures: A Cultural Investigation of Childbirth in Yucatan, Holland, Sweden, and the United States' (Fourth Edition)--the book that generated the fields of the anthropologies of midwifery and childbirth. The book was first published in 1978 and won the Margaret Mead Award in 1980. Jordan and Davis-Floyd had completed a comparative analysis on how culture interacts with the physiology of birth in four different territories, showing how birth is everywhere socially marked and shaped. Brigitte Jordan's concept of authoritative knowledge has been heavily promoted by Davis-Floyd both in her update of Birth in Four Cultures, in her co-edited 1997 collection Childbirth and Authoritative Knowleldge: Cross-Cultural Perspectives, and in her 2019 co-edited collection Birth in Eight Cultures, designed with Jordan's encouragement to replace Birth in Four Cultures for undergraduate and graduate teaching. This concept has been distributed and utilized by scholars around the world. By Jordan's definition, authoritative knowledge is the knowledge that counts in a given situation, on the basis of which people make decisions and take actions. It often subsists in a hierarchy of knowledge systems in which one holds more weight than the other. A system comes to carry more weight when it has superior purpose to explain a state of the world or greater hegemonic force because it is held by people in power. Both anthropologists have acknowledged the use and spread of high technologies as a cultural factor of authoritative knowledge. The use of technologies has contributed to a new symbiosis between humans and machines, the study of which is termed "Cyborg Anthropology." Anthropologist Donna Haraway proposed this new discipline and utilized by Joseph Dumit of MIT and Robbie Davis-Floyd in 1998. Davis-Floyd's research concerns reproduction and the technologies associated with birthing standards, in which the natural process of birth is intervened in via technologies that interfere with the hormonal flow of physiologic birth; she has shown in many publications how these standard procedures serve as rituals that convey the core values of technocratic society to birthing women and practitioners alike. She has also analyzed medical training as a rite of technocratic initiation.

Personal 
Davis-Floyd was born in Casper, Wyoming and is the daughter of Walter Gray Davis (an independent oil operator) and Robbie Elizabeth Davis (a homemaker and genealogist) whose maiden name was Peyton. In 1979, she married Robert N. Floyd (an architect) and later became a mother of two children, Peyton and Jason. Their daughter Peyton was killed in a car wreck in 2000 at the age of 20. At the request of Diony Young, editor of Birth: Issues in Perinatal Care, Robbie wrote an article about her experiences of Peyton's death called "Windows in Space/Time" (freely available on her website www.davis-floyd.com). It became the most-read article in the history of the journal.

Education 
Robbie Davis-Floyd was Valedictorian of her high school class at St. Mary's Hall in San Antonio, Texas. She attended Wellesley College between 1969 and 1970, then married and transferred to the University of Texas Austin where her first husband, Russell S. Johnson, was attending law school. Davis-Floyd later received her Bachelor of Arts from the University of Texas at Austin in 1972 (summa cum laude and with Special Honors in Plan II). She earned her Master of Arts degree in anthropology and folklore (1974), as well as her PhD (1986) from the University of Texas.

Career 
Robbie Davis-Floyd has served in the Department of Anthropology at the University of Texas (Austin) in various forms since 1992, and continues to do so. In 1975–1976, Davis-Floyd was a summer Spanish instructor for Centro de Artes y Lenguas Mexicanas, Cuernavaca in Morelos, Mexico. The following year she was a high school teacher for St. Mary's Hall in San Antonio (1977-1979). Davis-Floyd was an adjunct assistant professor of Sociology and Anthropology at the University of Tennessee, Chattanooga (1980-1983) and Trinity University, San Antonio (1987-1989). She was a lecturer at the University of Texas (Austin) then became senior lecturer of anthropology and senior research fellow around 1990-1992 and 1998-current. Davis-Floyd was a research associate in the Department of Anthropology at Rice University in Houston, Texas (1993, 1996, and 1999). In 1997–1999, Robbie Davis-Floyd was a participant of the Council for European studies for the International Research Planning Groups Program. She was a visiting lecturer at Baylor Medical School (1999), where she taught Baylor's first-ever course in Complementary and Alternative Medicine, and at Southern Methodist University (2002). Between 2002 and 2003, Davis-Floyd was the Flora Stone Mather Visiting Professor in the anthropology department at Case Western Reserve University and an adjunct associate professor. In 2019, Robbie Davis-Floyd continues to serve in the Department of Anthropology at University of Texas, Austin as Senior Research Fellow.

Membership 
Robbie Davis-Floyd is a member of the American Anthropological Association, American Holistic Medical Association, Association for Feminist Anthropology, the American College of Nurse-Midwives., and the Midwives Alliance of North America (MANA). Davis-Floyd served as consumer representative to the Board of the North American Registry of Midwives (NARM) for 15 years as well as serving on the Midwifery Certification Task Force 1994–1997. Davis-Floyd was chair of the editorial committee of the Coalition for Improving Maternity Services, helping to create the Mother-Friendly Childbirth Initiative for the US (1995). Currently, Davis-Floyd is a member of the board of the International MotherBaby Childbirth Organization (IMBCO) and lead editor for the International MotherBaby Childbirth Initiative. She has served as an executive board member and program chair of the Society for Medical Anthropology (SMA), from 2004 to 2007. Robbie Davis-Floyd was a founding member of the Council on Anthropology and Reproduction and currently serves as its senior advisor. She was also a member of Council on the Anthropology of Science, Technology, and Computing, Society for the Social Study of Science, as well as a board member of the Association for Pre- and Perinatal Psychology and Health for 19 years. She is listed in Who's Who in America, Who's Who in American Women, and Who's Who in the World.

BOOK SERIES LEAD EDITOR
Davis-Floyd serves as lead editor for a series on “Social Science Perspectives on Birth and Reproduction” for Routledge. To date the series contains Birthing Models on the Human Rights Frontier, The Global Witch Hunt, and Birth as an American Rite of Passage (see above). Books on birth among the Cree, by Ieva Paberzyte, and on midwifery in Yemen, by Annica Kempe, among others, to be added soon. The series is accepting book applications.

Publications

Books
 Davis-Floyd, Robbie. Birth As An American Rite Of Passage. Berkeley : University Of California Press, 1992. Print.
 Jordan, Brigitte. Birth in Four Cultures: A Crosscultural Investigation of Childbirth in Yucatan, Holland, Sweden, and the United States, Fourth Edition. Waveland Press. Print. Revised, expanded, and updated by Robbie Davis-Floyd, 1993.
 Davis-Floyd, Robbie E., and Carolyn Sargent. Childbirth and Authoritative Knowledge: Cross-Cultural Perspectives. University of California Press, 1997. Print.
Davis-Floyd, Robbie and P. Sven Arvidson, eds. Intuition: The Inside Story. New York: Routledge, 1997.
 Davis-Floyd, Robbie, and Joseph Dumit, eds. Ebrary, Inc. Cyborg Babies: From Techno-Sex to Techno-Tots. Routledge, New York, 1998. Print.
 Davis-Floyd, Robbie, and Gloria St John. St. From Doctor to Healer: The Transformative Journey. New Brunswick, NJ: Rutgers University Press, 1998. Print.
 Bourgeault, Ivy Lynn, et al., editors. Reconceiving Midwifery. McGill-Queen's University Press, 2004.
 Robbie Davis-Floyd and Christine Barbara Johnson, eds. Mainstreaming Midwives: The Politics of Change. New York: Routledge, 2006.
 Davis-Floyd, Robbie, et al., editors. Birth Models That Work. 1st ed., University of California Press, 2009.
Davis-Floyd, Robbie, Kenneth J. Cox, and Frank White. Space Stories: Oral Histories from the Pioneers of America's Space Program, Kindle e-book, 2012.
Davis-Floyd, Robbie and Charles Laughlin. The Power of Ritual. Brisbane Australia: Daily Grail Press.
Davis-Floyd, Robbie and Colleagues. Ways of Knowing about Birth: Mothers, Midwives, Medicine, and Birth Activism. Long Grove IL: Waveland Press, 2018.
Davis-Floyd, Robbie, and Melissa Cheyney. Birth in Eight Cultures. Long Grove IL: Waveland Press, 2019.

Books in process
Daviss, Betty-Anne and Robbie Davis-Floyd, eds. Birthing Models on the Human Rights Frontier: Speaking Truth to Power. New York and London: Routledge, in press, forthcoming 2020.
Gutschow, Kim, Robbie Davis-Floyd, and Betty-Anne Daviss. Sustainable Birth. Springer, forthcoming 2020.
Daviss, Betty-Anne, Hermine Hayes-Klein, and Robbie Davis-Floyd eds. The Global Witch Hunt Plaguing Birth: Practitioner Persecution and Restorative Resistance. 
Davis-Floyd, Robbie and Beverly Chalmers, eds. Birthing Techno-Sapiens: Human-Technology Co-Evolution and the Future of Reproduction

Articles
Davis-Floyd has authored or co-authored over 80 published articles and 23 encyclopedia entries. Many of her articles are freely available on her website www.davis-floyd.com, where her full CV is also available.

Awards and honors 
Robbie Davis-Floyd is a fellow recipient of the Society for Applied Anthropology at the University of Texas, Austin. She was a fellow of the National Endowment for the Humanities in 1980. Davis-Floyd was awarded a faculty development grant from Trinity University around 1988 and 1989. She was recognized as a research fellow from the University of Texas in 1994. In the same year, Robbie Davis-Floyd was an Academy of Consciousness Studies fellow at Princeton University. She received the Institute of Noetic Sciences grant (1995-1997). Davis-Floyd was honored with the American Society for Psychoprophylaxis in Obstetrics & Lamaze Research Award in 1996. In 1996-1998 and 1999–2000, Robbie Davis-Floyd received two Wenner-Gren Foundation for Anthropological Research grants. She also received multiple research grants from the American Institute of Aeronautics and Astronautics between 1996 and 1998. One of the research grants was provided by the Honeywell Corporation in 1998. These research grants were awarded for "Space Stories: Oral Histories from the Pioneers of the American Space Program.". In 2003, she (and Carolyn Sargent) received the Enduring Edited Collection Book Prize from the Council on Anthropology and Reproduction for Childbirth and Authoritative Knowledge. In 2005, she received the Transforming Birth Fund Grant Award for Research & Best Practice Dissemination to support Birth Models that Work, via the Foundation for the Advancement of Midwifery. Davis-Floyd received the Transforming Birth Fund Grant Award for Changemakers in 2006, which was supported by Waterbirth International. During 2007 Davis-Floyd received an award from the Transforming Birth Fund Grant Award (for Research & Best Practice Dissemination) to have key articles and chapters of hers translated into Spanish. Her work was long supported by a grant from the Foundation for the Advancement of Midwifery. and is now supported by an ongoing grant from the Association for Pre- and Perinatal Psychology and Health. Robbie Davis-Floyd was recognized by the NARM board for her 15 years of service to the North American Registry of Midwives and was honored with an award from MANA for her years of service to American midwifery in 2012. She was also awarded with an "Homenagem" from ReHuNa, a birth activist organization in Brazil that was presented to her by the Brazilian Minister of Health in 2010 for defining "the technocratic, humanistic, and holistic paradigms of birth and health care"—theoretical concepts she created to help practitioners and mothers understand the implications of their ideological choices for the management and outcomes of their births.

References

External links 
 Official website

1952 births
Living people
Cultural anthropologists
American anthropologists